Taşkonak is a village in the Güçlükonak District of Şırnak Province in Turkey. The settlement is populated by Kurds of the Jilyan tribe and had a population of 13 in 2021.

The hamlet of Çanaklı is attached to Taşkonak.

References 

Villages in Güçlükonak District
Kurdish settlements in Şırnak Province